The 1st Mirchi Music Awards, presented by the Radio Mirchi, honoured the best of Hindi music from the year 2008. The ceremony was held on 28 March 2009 at the Hotel Taj Lands End, Bandra, Mumbai and was hosted by Shaan and Tulip Joshi. There were many performances, including those by Dominique Cerejo, Benny Dayal, Manohari Singh, Bipasha Basu, Shreya Ghoshal, Genelia D'Souza, Kunal Ganjawala, Shahid Kapoor and Prachi Shah, the winner of the Tata Indicom Talent Hunt. Awards were given out in 17 different categories. Jodhaa Akbar won a leading seven awards including Song of the Year. Album of the Year was won by film Jaane Tu... Ya Jaane Na. The show was broadcast on 12 April 2009 on StarPlus.

Winners and nominees 

The winners were selected by the members of jury, chaired by Javed Akhtar. The following are the names of winners.

Film awards

Technical awards

Special awards

Listeners' Choice awards

Films with multiple wins

Jury 
The jury was chaired by Javed Akhtar. Other members were:

 Anu Malik - music director
 Lalit Pandit - composer
 Kailash Kher - singer
 Kavita Krishnamurthy - playback singer
 Kunal Kohli - director
 Louis Banks - composer, record producer and singer
 Prasoon Joshi - lyricist and screenwriter
 Rakeysh Omprakash Mehra - filmmaker and screenwriter
 Ramesh Sippy - director and producer
 Sadhana Sargam - playback singer
 Shankar Mahadevan - composer and playback singer
 Sonu Nigam - playback singer
 Suresh Wadkar - playback singer

See also 
 Mirchi Music Awards

References

External links 
 Music Mirchi Awards Official Website
 Music Mirchi Awards 2008

Mirchi Music Awards